Do Premee ( The two Lovers) is a 1980 Indian Hindi-language Romance film produced by Kundan A. Thadani. The film is directed by Raj Khosla. The film stars Rishi Kapoor, Moushumi Chatterjee in lead roles, along with Om Prakash, I. S. Johar, Deven Verma and music is by Laxmikant–Pyarelal.

Synopsis 
This is a love story of Chetan (Rishi Kapoor) and Payal (Moushumi Chatterjee). They love each other very much and want to get married. They confess their love to their fathers Daulatram (I. S. Johar) and Bhagwant Singh (Om Prakash) respectively, but their fathers are not happy with their children's choice and they want them to marry their own choice life partner. As their fathers are not happy so couple finds way elope and get married. Bhagwant Singh gives an advertisement in the newspaper to get the information on his daughter and offers a good reward for the same. On the other hand, Chetan is looking for a job and manage to get a job as a car driver and Payal works as a maid. Later Chetan and Payal come to know a dark secret of their employer that endangers their life!

Cast 

Rishi Kapoor as Chetan
Moushumi Chatterjee as Payal / Parvati
Geeta Behl as Geeta
Om Prakash as Retired Colonel Bhagwant Singh
I. S. Johar as Daulatram
Deven Verma as Murari Bhonsle 
Roopesh Kumar as Suresh
Bhagwan Dada as Bhagwan
K. N. Singh as Geeta's uncle
Raj Kumar Kapoor (Raj Bharti) as Gurudev/Dragon/Mahayogi/Shivlal
Raj Kishore as Pandit at Temple
 Piloo Wadia as Typist at Nisha Ads
 M.L. Nawab  as marriage registrar
Gautam Sarin as Police Inspector 
Aruna Irani as Special Appearance in song "Allah, Meri Payal Bole Chhan Chhan"

Crew
Director - Raj Khosla
Producer - Kundan A. Thadani
Story - Gulshan Nanda,G.R. Kamat
Writer - Gulshan Nanda,G.R. Kamat
Dialogue - Rahi Masoom Reza
Editor - Waman B. Bhosle
Cinematographer - Fali Mistry
Screenplay - Raj Bharti 
Art Director - Ram Yedekar
Costume Designer - Padma U. Thadani,Reshma K. Thadani
Choreographer - Kamal
 Camera  - R. Nair, Magan Singh

Music
All lyrics were provided by Anand Bakshi and music is written by Laxmikant-Pyarelal.

References

External links
 

1980 films
Indian romance films
1980s Hindi-language films
1980s romance films
Hindi-language romance films
Films directed by Raj Khosla